William Porter (fl. 1388) was an English Member of Parliament and grocer.

He was a Member (MP) of the Parliament of England for Southwark in February 1388.

References

14th-century births
Year of death missing
14th-century English people
People from Southwark
Members of the Parliament of England (pre-1707)